Charlo (Salish: sallu) is an unincorporated community and census-designated place (CDP) in Lake County, Montana, United States. The population was 379 at the 2010 census, down from 439 in 2000. The 2018 population estimate was 320. 

The town was named in 1918 for a Salish chief. Previously it had been called Big Flat, Charlotte, and Tabor.

Geography
Charlo is located in southern Lake County at  (47.440017, -114.173171), along Montana Highway 212.

Charlo is within the Flathead Indian Reservation.

Demographics

Warning

The 2000 data below is out of date.
To access the last available data (2018 estimate), connect to data.census.gov.
Note that the numbers are estimated with an important margin error. 
It would be better to wait the results of the 2020 Census.

2000 Data
At the 2000 census, there were 439 people, 166 households and 112 families residing in the CDP. The population density was 219.4 per square mile (84.7/km). There were 175 housing units at an average density of 87.5 per square mile (33.8/km). The racial makeup of the CDP was 76.77% White, 1.14% African American, 17.77% Native American, 2.05% from other races, and 2.28% from two or more races. Hispanic or Latino of any race were 2.73% of the population.

There were 166 households, of which 42.8% had children under the age of 18 living with them, 47.6% were married couples living together, 15.7% had a female householder with no husband present, and 32.5% were non-families. 26.5% of all households were made up of individuals, and 14.5% had someone living alone who was 65 years of age or older. The average household size was 2.64 and the average family size was 3.22.

36.0% of the population were under the age of 18, 7.3% from 18 to 24, 26.4% from 25 to 44, 18.2% from 45 to 64, and 12.1% who were 65 years of age or older. The median age was 32 years. For every 100 females, there were 96.0 males. For every 100 females age 18 and over, there were 97.9 males.

The median household income was $24,167 and the median family income was $32,500. Males had a median income of $25,577 and females $17,250. The per capita income was $10,687. About 16.0% of families and 21.2% of the population were below the poverty line, including 23.9% of those under age 18 and 8.1% of those age 65 or over.

Town events
Each year, residents of Charlo host a Fourth of July parade and cookout along Main Street (Highway 212). Regular participants include local equestrian units, Charlo "all school" alumni, representatives from all branches of military service, and the local fire department.

Conservation
Charlo borders several protected areas, including the Herak Waterfowl Production area and Ninepipes Reservoir. These protected areas, along with seasonal flood irrigation, provide habitats for various native fauna such as white-tailed deer, pheasants, bald eagles, and western painted turtles.

Charlo is host of Owl Research Institute managing scientific research on Owls of all species.
Close to the lake, are implemented 2 platforms for osprey nests. 
During the 2020 season, the first nest, used by ospreys in 2019, was squattered by geese and the osprey family - Charlie and Charlotte - moved to the second one. Actually, they are taking care of two chicks.

Education
Charlo School District educates students from kindergarten through 12th grade. They are known as the Vikings. Charlo High School is a Class C school.

References

Census-designated places in Lake County, Montana
Census-designated places in Montana